Panthera is a genus of big cats.

Panthera may also refer to:
Pipistrel Panthera, a Slovenian light aircraft model
Panthera Corporation, a conservation charity for big cats
Black panther, any melanistic color variant of Panthera
Panthera, a soldier referred to in the Talmud as Jesus' real father:
Tiberius Julius Abdes Pantera, a Roman soldier of the Cohors I Sagittariorum, speculated to be Panthera
Panthera, a poem by Thomas Hardy
Panthera AB, a Swedish wheelchair manufacturer
Panthera Virus, Italian drag queen

See also
Pantera (disambiguation)
Panther (disambiguation)
Pantha (disambiguation)
Black panther (disambiguation)
Panter, a surname